Crni Lug (Serbian Cyrillic: Црни Луг) is a Serbian village situated in Vranje, Pčinja District. As of 2002, it has a population of 266.

Populated places in Pčinja District